Menq Enq Mer Sarerệ, or by its English title Heartbeat of my Land, is the third album by Armenian folk singers Inga and Anush.

Track listing

External links 
 
Buy the Album

2009 albums